The National Socialist Society (NSO; ; Natsional-sotsialisticheskoye obshchestvo, NSO) was an illegal ultra-right Russian neo-Nazi organization founded in 2004 by Dmitry Rumyantsev (Russian: Дмитрий Германович Румянцев) and Sergei "Maluta" Korotkikh (Russian: Сергей Аркадьевич Коротких, "Mалюта", "Боцман"). The National Socialist Society proclaimed the task the construction of a Russian nation state on the basis of Nazi ideology.

In July 2011, 13 members of the organization were found guilty of committing 28 racist murders and over 50 attacks on non-Russians and members of the LGBT community in Moscow.

See also 
 
 Combat Terrorist Organization
 NS/WP Crew
 The Savior (paramilitary organization)

In popular culture 

 "From Russia with hate" TV episode S1.E6 by Christof Putzel
 "Ross Kemp on Gangs. Moscow" TV documentary by Ross Kemp
 "Credit for Murder" documentary by Vlady Antonevicz

References

Banned far-right parties
Banned political parties in Russia
Far-right political parties in Russia
2004 establishments in Russia
Fascist parties in Russia
Nationalist movements in Asia
Nationalist movements in Europe
Neo-Nazi organizations
Neo-Nazism in Russia
Russian nationalist organizations
Terrorism in Russia
Anti-communist organizations
2010 disestablishments in Russia
Political parties established in 2004
Political parties disestablished in 2010
Defunct nationalist parties in Russia
Defunct far-right parties
Neo-fascist parties
Neo-fascist terrorism